WINS may refer to:

WINS (AM), an all-news radio station in New York City
WINS-FM, a radio station in New York City
World Institute for Nuclear Security
Windows Internet Name Service
WINS (solution stack), a set of software subsystems 
Wireless integrated network sensors
SM&A, stock ticker symbol WINS
WINS, off-course betting facilities operated by Japan Racing Association

See also
 Win (disambiguation)
 WINZ (disambiguation)